The 1932 Georgetown Hoyas football team represented Georgetown University during the 1932 college football season. The team began the season under third-year head coach Tommy Mills, who resigned after five games. He was replaced by Jack Hagerty, who guided the Hoyas for the final four games of the season.  Georgetown finished the year with an overall record of 2–6–1.

Schedule

References

Georgetown
Georgetown Hoyas football seasons
Georgetown Hoyas football